Sky Trek Tower is a  gyro tower located at Six Flags Great America in Gurnee, Illinois, United States. Manufactured by Intamin, the attraction is the tallest free-standing structure in Lake County, Illinois. Opening on June 28, 1977, the ride was part of an expansion program by the Marriott Corporation following the opening of their Great America parks the year prior.

History 

After the opening of Marriott's Great America in 1976, the Marriott Corporation decided to build an Intamin gyro tower model at the theme park as part of an expansion program for the 1977 season. After fabrication in Germany, the attraction was carried by ship to the United States. After construction on the attraction, the ride officially opened to the public on June 28, 1977, as the tallest free-standing structure in Lake County, Illinois. A photograph of the construction of the attraction by Chicago Tribune photographer Luigi Mendocino won the Chicago Builders' Association's photography competition on December 13, 1977. 

Marriott Corporation would later open a ride of the same model called the "Sky Tower" for the 1979 season at the park's then-sister park of the same name, later renamed to California's Great America. The height of that attraction was shortened to  due to the proximity of San Jose International Airport.

The attraction was repainted in 2009 by Baynum Painting from the original white color to blue with the words "Six Flags" on the side of the color. Since the 2020 season, the ride has stood in a standing but not operating status.

Ride experience 
The cabin rises up  to the ride's architectural peak and back down. During the ride, facts about the history of Six Flags Great America are given and on clear days, gives views of the Chicago skyline.

Incidents 
On June 22, 2015, the cabin stopped abruptly, trapping riders for over two hours before they were released through an emergency staircase. The park clarified that the ride did not drop at high speeds. A year later, on September 22, 2016, while an employee was erecting an inflatable gorilla for the park's Halloween event Six Flags Fright Fest, the employee suffered a back ache, requiring the Gurnee Fire Department to rescue them.

See also 

 Gyro tower

References 

 Notes

 References

External links 

 Official website

Six Flags Great America
Towers completed in 1977